Ivatino is a rural locality (a village) in Danilovskoye Rural Settlement, Melenkovsky District, Vladimir Oblast, Russia. The population was 582 as of 2010. There are 15 streets.

Geography 
Ivatino is located on the Unzha River, 6 km northwest of Melenki (the district's administrative centre) by road. Priklon is the nearest rural locality.

References 

Rural localities in Melenkovsky District